Raven is the second studio album by American singer and songwriter Kelela. It was released on February 10, 2023, via Warp Records. It comes six years after the release of Kelela's debut album Take Me Apart, which was lauded by critics as one of the best albums of 2017. In a press release, Kelela said Raven began as a reaction to feeling alone as a Black femme working within dance music, and describes the album as an affirmation of that perspective. Raven was supported by the singles "Washed Away", "Happy Ending", "On the Run", "Contact", and "Enough for Love".

Critical reception

Upon release, Raven received widespread acclaim from music critics. At Metacritic, which assigns a normalized rating out of 100 to reviews from mainstream critics, the album received an average score of 86, based on 17 critical reviews, indicating "universal acclaim".

Reviewing the album for AllMusic, Andy Kellman described the album as a series of, "Constant if fluid oscillations between diaphanous ballads, pulsing slow jams, and modern street soul bangers are just as suited for the greater number of songs based in relationships." 

Joey Levenson at NME compared it to Kelela's debut, saying it "makes for a frequently breathtaking companion to Take Me Apart," and in a "debut album which was all about breaking down, Raven reminds us of what it means to be put back together".

Pitchfork designated the album "Best New Music", with Eric Torres calling it a "rapturous" and "masterful display of tension and release, centering queer Black womanhood through blasts of heated dance music and ambient comedowns".

Track listing 
All tracks written by Kelela, except "Closure", written by Kelela & Rahrah Gabor. All tracks arranged by Kelela. Additional lyricists are listed.

Notes
  signifies an additional producer.

Charts

Release history

References 

2023 albums
Kelela albums
Warp (record label) albums